Trapeza is a village in Cyprus, east of Kyrenia. De facto, it is under the control of Northern Cyprus. Its population in 2011 was 42.

References

Communities in Kyrenia District
Populated places in Girne District